The 2019 Campeonato Brasileiro Série B was a football competition held in Brazil, equivalent to the second division. The competition started on 26 April and ended on 30 November 2019.

Twenty teams competed in the tournament, twelve returning from the 2018 season, four promoted from the 2018 Campeonato Brasileiro Série C (Botafogo-SP, Bragantino, Cuiabá and Operário Ferroviário), and four relegated from the 2018 Campeonato Brasileiro Série A (América Mineiro, Paraná, Sport and Vitória).

Red Bull GmbH signed a deal with the promoted team Bragantino. Team was merged with Red Bull Brasil and renamed as RB Bragantino, although in the 2019 Série B their name was simply Bragantino with Red Bull as main sponsor.

In the 17th round (20 August), Figueirense players refused to play their away match against Cuiabá in protest over unpaid wages. Cuiabá was awarded a 3–0 win by forfeit. On 4 October, Figueirense was sanctioned by the Superior Tribunal de Justiça Desportiva (STJD) with loss of three points and a fine of R$3,000. Few days later the STJD corrected its decision and gave back the three points to Figueirense.

The top four teams were promoted to the 2020 Campeonato Brasileiro Série A. Bragantino became the first club to be promoted after a 3–1 win against Guarani on 5 November 2019. Sport was promoted on 20 November, and Coritiba and Atlético Goianiense on 30 November.

Teams

Number of teams by state

Venues

Personnel and kits

Managerial changes

League table

Results

Top goalscorers

References 

Campeonato Brasileiro Série B seasons
2